= Gabriela Basterra =

American academic

Gabriela Basterra is a professor of Comparative Literature and Spanish at New York University. She is primarily known for her work on philosophy and literature, ethical subjectivity, rhetoric, poetry, tragedy, psychoanalysis, ethics and politics.

Basterra is the author of:

- Seductions of Fate: Tragic Subjectivity, Ethics, Politics (2004).
- The Subject of Freedom: Kant, Levinas (2015).
